Elna Reinach and Nathalie Tauziat were the defending champions, but Reinach decided not to participate this year. Tauziat partnered with Julie Halard, but lost in the first round to Dominique Van Roost and Maja Murić.

Nicole Arendt and Manon Bollegraf won the title, defeating Lisa Raymond and Rennae Stubbs 7–6(8–6), 4–6, 6–2 in the final.

Seeds

Draw

References
Main Draw

Challenge Bell
Tournoi de Québec
Can